Kuchenan (also Romanized as Kūchenān) is a village in Alamut-e Bala Rural District, Rudbar-e Alamut District, Qazvin County, Qazvin Province, Iran. At the 2016 census, its population was 445.

References 

Populated places in Qazvin County